Nadine Netter Levy (born October 26, 1944) is an American former professional tennis player. She competed in the French Open, Wimbledon, and at the US Open, and won a silver medal in women's doubles at the 1965 Maccabiah Games in Israel.

Biography
Netter was born to parents who were recent arrivals. Her German father Kurt and Swiss mother Alice (Dreyfus) both left Europe in the early stages of World War II. She grew up in New York and is Jewish.

She attended Scarsdale High School and Wellesley College ('66), graduated with a degree in German ,and was inducted into the Wellesley College Athletics Hall of Fame.  She earned a Master’s of International Affairs degree from Columbia University. She won the Eastern Women's College Tournament in 1962, and was the Eastern Intercollegiate Champion and New England Intercollegiate women's Tennis Championship winner in 1965.

Active on tour in the 1960s, Netter competed internationally in the French Open and Wimbledon. She reached the third round of the U.S. National Championships in 1962 and was a doubles quarter-finalist at the US Open in 1968.

At the 1965 Maccabiah Games in Israel, she and partner Carole Wright won a silver medal in women's doubles, losing in the finals to South Africans Esmé Emmanuel and Rene Wolpert.

References

External links
 
 

1944 births
Living people
American female tennis players
Jewish tennis players
Tennis people from New York (state)
American people of German descent
American people of Swiss descent
Maccabiah Games silver medalists for the United States
Competitors at the 1965 Maccabiah Games
Maccabiah Games medalists in tennis
Jewish American sportspeople
Wellesley College alumni
School of International and Public Affairs, Columbia University alumni